H. Chims was the fifth Surveyor General of Ceylon. He was appointed in 1846, succeeding F. B. Norris, and held the office until 1854. He was succeeded by W. D. Gosset.

References

C